The reciprocals of prime numbers have been of interest to mathematicians for various reasons.  They do not have a finite sum, as Leonhard Euler proved in 1737.  

Like all rational numbers, the reciprocals of primes have repeating decimal representations.  In his later years, George Salmon (1819–1904) concerned himself with the repeating periods of these decimal representations of reciprocals of primes.

Contemporaneously, William Shanks (1812–1882) calculated numerous reciprocals of primes and their repeating periods, and published two papers "On Periods in the Reciprocals of Primes" in 1873 and 1874. In 1874 he also published a table of primes, and the periods of their reciprocals, up to 20,000 (with help from and "communicated by the Rev. George Salmon"), and pointed out the errors in previous tables by three other authors.

Rules for calculating the periods of repeating decimals from rational fractions were given by James Whitbread Lee Glaisher in 1878.  For a prime , the period of its reciprocal will be equal to or will divide .

The sequence of recurrence periods of the reciprocal primes  appears in the 1973 Handbook of Integer Sequences.

Unique primes 

A prime p ≠ 2, 5 is called unique if there is no other prime q such that the period length of the decimal expansion of its reciprocal, 1 / p, is equal to the period length of the reciprocal of q, 1 / q. For example, 3 is the only prime with period 1, 11 is the only prime with period 2, 37 is the only prime with period 3, 101 is the only prime with period 4, so they are unique primes. Unique primes were described by Samuel Yates in 1980.

At present, more than fifty unique primes or probable primes are known.

 the repunit (108177207 – 1)/9 is the largest known probable unique prime.

In 1996 the largest proven unique prime was (101132 + 1)/10001 or, using the notation above, (99990000)141 + 1. It has 1128 digits.

References

External links
 

Prime numbers
Rational numbers